Rangamatia Union is a union of Fatikchhari Upazila of Chittagong District.

Geography
Area:

Location
 North: Kanchan nagar Union
 East:  Lelang Union
 South: Daulatpur Union
 West:  Sundarpur Union

Population
At the 1991 Bangladesh census, Rangamatia union had a population of 15,628 and house units 2,592.

References
 Details about Rangamatia Union, lcgbangladesh.org

Unions of Fatikchhari Upazila